Gert Trasha (born January 31, 1988 in Elbasan) is an Albanian weightlifter. At age sixteen, Trasha became one of the youngest weightlifters to mark their official debut at the 2004 Summer Olympics in Athens, representing his nation Albania. He placed thirteenth in the men's featherweight class (62 kg), as he successfully lifted 115 kg in the single-motion snatch, and hoisted 140 kg in the two-part, shoulder-to-overhead clean and jerk, for a total of 255 kg.

At the 2008 Summer Olympics in Beijing, Trasha switched to a heavier class by competing in the men's lightweight division. Unlike his previous Olympics, Trasha did not finish the event, after failing to lift a snatch of 136 kg in three attempts.

References

External links
NBC Olympics Profile

Albanian male weightlifters
1988 births
Living people
Olympic weightlifters of Albania
Weightlifters at the 2004 Summer Olympics
Weightlifters at the 2008 Summer Olympics
Sportspeople from Elbasan
Mediterranean Games bronze medalists for Albania
Mediterranean Games medalists in weightlifting
Competitors at the 2005 Mediterranean Games
21st-century Albanian people